Frontier of the Dawn also Frontier of Dawn is a 2008 French drama film directed by Philippe Garrel. It stars Louis Garrel, Laura Smet, and Clémentine Poidatz. It tells the story of a photographer who is haunted by the ghost of his dead lover. It was screened at the 2008 Cannes Film Festival in competition. It was released in France on 8 October 2008.

Plot
A photographer François visits actress Carole's apartment to take pictures of her. Although Carole has a husband, François and Carole have an affair for a while. After François ends their relationship, Carole suffers a mental illness and commits suicide. A year later, François's lover Ève gets pregnant, and the two will get married. François is haunted by Carole's ghost.

Cast

Release
The film had its world premiere in the Competition section at the 2008 Cannes Film Festival on 22 May 2008. It was released in France on 8 October 2008.

Reception
On review aggregation website Rotten Tomatoes, the film holds an approval rating of 50% based on 6 reviews, and an average rating of 6.1/10.

Aaron Cutler of Slant Magazine wrote: "At times Frontier feels more like homage than like a film in its own right, but if its goal is to pay tribute to the dead, lost, and forgotten, then a reheated quality may be precisely the point." Karina Longworth of IndieWire wrote: "Hands down the most accessible Garrel film I've seen, it's still a strange, swoony, genre-bending challenge."

Writing for The New Yorker, Richard Brody listed it as one of the best films of 2009.

References

External links
 

2008 films
2008 drama films
2000s French-language films
French drama films
French black-and-white films
Films directed by Philippe Garrel
2000s French films